Dai pai dong is a type of open-air food stall.  The term originates from Hong Kong but has been adopted outside Hong Kong as well. The official government name for these establishments is "cooked-food stalls". The more common name, dai pai dong, literally means "big licence stall" in Cantonese, referring to the stalls' license plates, which are larger than those of other licensed street vendors.

Founded after the Second World War, dai pai dong are tucked next to buildings, on streets and in alleys. For instance, the dai pai dong in Central and Western districts are regard as "terrace type" dai pai dong since most of the streets are sloped, meaning the stalls occupy different terraces. In the late 20th century, the Hong Kong government decided to restrict the operation and license of dai pai dong in order to remove them from public streets. Some were relocated into indoor cooked food markets built by the government. After the decline of dai pai dong from the 1970s, most of them no longer operate within the family but through sole proprietorship or partnership instead.

According to the Food and Environmental Hygiene Department, there are only 25 dai pai dong remaining in Hong Kong. As a valuable touchstone of Hong Kong heritage and culture, the word dai pai dong was recognized by the Oxford English Dictionary in March 2016.

Characteristics
A dai pai dong is characterized by its green-painted steel kitchen, untidy atmosphere, the lack of air conditioning, as well as a variety of low priced great-wok hei dishes. Regarded by some as part of the collective memory of Hong Kong people, official dai pai dong are scarce today, numbering only 28, situated in Central (10), Sham Shui Po (14), Wan Chai (1), Tai Hang (2), and Tai O (1).

Although the term dai pai dong is often used generically to refer to any food stall operating on the roadside with foldable tables, chairs and no air-conditioning (like those on Temple Street), legally speaking the term can only refer to those 28 stalls which possess the "big licences".

History
Unlicensed food stalls, which provide cheap everyday food such as congee, rice and noodles to the general public of humble income, appeared as early as the late 19th century in Hong Kong. The stalls could be found not only in Central, but also in Wan Chai and the peripheries of Happy Valley Racecourse around Wong Nai Chung Road. In fact, the fire at the racecourse in 1918 was caused by food stalls set beside the podium. There were also stalls assembled by wharf piers, which formed the so-called Waisik Matau (為食碼頭 lit. "Gluttonous Pier"), to serve ferry passengers.

After World War II came to an end in 1945, the colonial Hong Kong government issued ad hoc licenses to families of deceased and injured civil servants, allowing them to operate food stalls in public and thereby earn a living. This type of license was physically considerably larger than the ones normally issued, as a photograph of the licensee was required to appear on them. The licence, therefore, was jocularly called "dai pai" (big license) by the locals. From then on, the "big license stalls" began to flourish on every busy street and lane in Hong Kong. 

However, dai pai dong soon became the cause of traffic congestion and hygiene problems, and some licensees even began to let out their stalls on the black market. In response, the government stopped issuing new "big licenses" in 1956, and limited their transfer. The licences could no longer be inherited, and could only be passed on to spouses upon the licensee's death. If the licensee did not have a spouse, the licence would simply expire.

Since 1975, many dai pai dong have been moved into temporary markets, like the ones on Haiphong Road, Tsim Sha Tsui, or into cooked food centres, usually located in municipal services complexes managed by the Urban Council, for easier control. To improve worsening public hygiene, the government began to buy back "big licenses" from the license-holders in 1983. Since most of the licensees were aged, and the licenses are only legally transferable to their spouses, many of the licensees were willing to return their licenses for compensation. Since then, the number of traditional dai pai dong has declined rapidly.

Today, most dai pai dong survive by operating in cooked food centers, while the more successful ones have reinvented themselves as air-conditioned restaurants (some of them keep their original stalls operating at the same time, like Lan Fong Yuen (蘭芳園) in Gage Street, Central).

It was reported that revenues of dai pai dong increased considerably in 2003 when Hong Kong was plagued by SARS; as people regarded air-conditioned places as hotbeds of the virus and patronised open-air and sun-lit stalls instead.

Features

One can tailor dishes on the menu to their liking, such as asking for a non-spicy variation.
The Hong Kong Local dishes are in large portions, cheap and tasty. It is part of the Hong Kong people's collective memory.
It is customary to have to share tables with complete strangers when there is a shortage of seating.
Some of the dai pai dong have problems with hygiene and upkeep, for example, rickety tables and stools, battered metal pots and bamboo chopsticks, and unappetizingly slick floors.
As dai pai dong is set up by four canvas stands, all one-storey tall, into the road it is better to add a cover, prevent some stuff dropped while people eating.
Many dishes are cooked in a wok over a large flame. Chefs cook quickly and utilise stir-frying techniques to mix flavours and ingredients speedily.
Unlike cha chaan teng, most dai pai dong do not provide set meals. 
"Cross-stall ordering" is possible: for instance, when one is sitting and eating in a stall selling noodles, he or she can order a cup of milk tea from another stall, which may be several stalls away. 
The stalls can be roughly divided into those operating in daytime and those doing business at night. The dai pai dong which operate at night usually sell seafood and other more costly dishes: one dish usually costs from HKD$40–70. The day-time dai pai dong, on the contrary, provide cheap food including:
Congee and youtiao (aka yau cha kwai); 
Milk tea, toasts, sandwiches and instant noodles with ham, egg, luncheon meat or sausage;
rice or noodles with siu mei (燒味 roasted meats);
fried rice and dip tau fan (碟頭飯 rice plates);
Chiuchow-style noodles (潮州粉麵).

Preservation
In May 2005, the existence of dai pai dong in Hong Kong caught considerable public attention, as Man Yuen Noodles, a dai pai dong selling noodles in Central, faced imminent closure due to the death of the licensee. The news came after the closure of a bakery notable for its egg tarts, also located in Central and forced to close because of the rise of rent.

Despite calls for its preservation by many locals, including some politicians, the stall was closed on 30 July 2005. The Hong Kong government was criticised for not trying its best to preserve dai pai dong as part of the Hong Kong culture. The news of the closure coincided with the government's proposal of the development of West Kowloon Cultural District. The bakery reopened in October 2005. The stall unexpectedly reopened at a nearby shop on 1 December 2005.

See also
 Cantonese restaurant
 Cart noodle
 Hawkers in Hong Kong
 Pai dong

References

Further reading
Cheng Po Hung (2003). Early Hong Kong Eateries. Hong Kong: University Museum and Art Gallery, the University of Hong Kong.
Ng Ka Wing Karen, Wong Lai Wah and Yiu Shuk Hing. From the Streets to the Shopping Arcades – Dai Pai Dong Culture in Hong Kong, paper issued by the Creative Learning and Hong Kong Culture and Society Project (CLHKCSP).

External links

大排檔活化工程| Rejuvenation of Cooked Food Stall Website about Wong Tai Sin's cooked food stall(黃大仙冬菇亭).
List of Dai Pai Dongs in Hong Kong
 28夕陽大牌檔 世紀街頭巷戰, Apple Daily, 6 September 2006.
A picture of Man Yuen Noodles, Apple Daily, 26 July 2005.
HONG KONG DAIPAIDONG: What's for lunch?, video and text.
Short documentary video about the dai pai dong along the escalator in Central. Video was shot shortly before the destruction of the Dai Pai Dong in August 2010.

Cantonese words and phrases
Hong Kong cuisine
Restaurants by type